Abu Abdallah Muhammad V (4 January 1339 – 16 January 1391), known by the regnal name al-Ghani bi'llah, was the eighth Nasrid ruler of the Emirate of Granada in Al-Andalus on the Iberian Peninsula.

Muhammad V was the eldest son and heir of Yusuf I by his slave Butayna, born on Sunday, 4 January 1339.  He also had a younger full-blood sister, A'isha, two half brothers and five half-sisters.  He ruled between 1354–1359 and 1362–1391, and is best known for completing the royal palace of the Alhambra with the Palace of the Lions and the Mexuar, or Cuarto Dorado.

Sultan
He inherited the throne from Yusuf I but was overthrown in August 1359 by his half-brother Ismail II and sought protection with the Marinid sultan of Fez, where Muhammad was inspired with fresh examples of architecture. Isma'il was overthrown and murdered with his brother Qays less than a year later in 1360, by his brother-in-law, Abu Said, who ruled as Muhammad VI but was overthrown in turn by Muhammad V, who returned to the throne for another 29 years.

During the three-year period of the reign of Muhammad VI, Muhammad V was plotting his return to power. A chance came in 1362 when King Peter I of Castile (Pedro el Cruel) lured Muhammad VI to his kingdom. There, in Seville, he was murdered and his head sent to Muhammad V as a gift upon his return to the throne. As a gesture of good relations between him and the Marinid, the eldest son of Muhammad V, Yusuf II, married to a daughter of the Marinid Sultan. 

In 1365, Sultan Muhammed V had the Maristan of Granada at the foot of his Alhambra palace built - it was one of the earliest European hospitals that also included care for the mentally ill.

He employed the poet and diplomat Ibn Khaldun in negotiations with Pedro the Cruel.

Death
Muhammad V died on 16 January 1391. He had at least four sons; Yusuf II, Nasr, Muhammad and Sa'd. He was succeeded by his son, Yusuf II.

References

Sources
The Alhambra From the Ninth Century to Yusuf I (1354). vol. 1. Saqi Books, 1997.
Pedro the Cruel of Castile 1350-1359 (The Medieval Mediterranean : Peoples, Economies and Cultures, 400-1453, Vol 6) by Clara Esto; Brill Academic Publishers, 1995
The Three Great Sultans of al-Dawla al-Ismā'īliyya al-Naṣriyya Who Built the Fourteenth-Century Alhambra: Ismā'īl I, Yūsuf I, Muḥammad V (713-793/1314-1391) Antonio Fernández-Puertas, Journal of the Royal Asiatic Society, Third Series, Vol. 7, No. 1 (Apr. 1997), pp. 1–25
 

Sultans of Granada
14th-century monarchs in Europe
1338 births
1391 deaths
14th century in Al-Andalus
14th-century people from al-Andalus
14th-century Arabs